Altrincham Grammar School for Girls, also known as Altrincham Girls Grammar School (AGGS) is a girls' grammar school with academy status in Bowdon, Greater Manchester, England. With about 1,250 students aged 11 to 18, it is the biggest single-sex grammar school in England.

History 
Altrincham Grammar School for Girls was founded in 1910. With many other schools, it was a product of the 1902 Education Act, which set out to build new schools to provide enhanced education for girls. Originally dual schools for girls and boys were envisaged for the site, which had been occupied by a substantial derelict house with spacious grounds, Bowdon Lodge. However, it was finally agreed that there was insufficient space for both, and the girls' school was built there and Altrincham County High School for Boys, now Altrincham Grammar School for Boys, was built elsewhere.

The building was designed to accommodate one hundred and eighty children, thirty of whom were at nursery age, and the school was opened on Monday, 4 July 1910. In September 1910, the school was eventually populated by sixty pupils. Three full-time and five part-time staff were employed. In 1931, the school's 21st anniversary, it lost most of its preparatory department. The headmistress for the first twenty-three years of AGGS was Miss Mary Howes Smith; she retired in 1933.

The school motto, which can still be seen on an illuminated light-oak board in the main hall, is Fortiter, Fideliter, Feliciter: Bravely, Faithfully and Cheerfully.

During the late 1960s the school expanded further, across Cavendish Road and into a large Victorian Villa known as 'Breeze Hill'. The villa had extensive grounds, which the school put to good use with a number of Portakabin like classroom structures. The rooms within the villa were also made into classrooms including a large art room which benefited from the light from the large Victorian windows. The difficulty came as the pupils had to cross Cavendish Road, sometimes a number of times each day, and the road was fairly busy, causing safety issues.

The school has undergone much building work. In 1983, Fairlie was built on the opposite side of Cavendish Road. The school has seen developments to the Main school building as well, beginning with the science block at the East Wing was built, and continuing with a new reception area and Dining room, plus a new science staffroom and four new science labs. The West wing, with a new library, was added in 2003. It features a floating first floor with a stainless steel staircase in the middle. The most recent addition to AGGS is the new Breeze Hill, replacing an older building of the same name and including three Geography and History rooms and an ICT suite as well as a Training Room, where courses and conferences for teachers from around the North-West are held.

In 2010 the school celebrated its centenary year; a centenary garden was built in commemoration.

In 2011, the headmistress from 1997 onward, Dame Dana Ross-Wawrzynski, set up the 'Bright Futures Educational Trust'. This is a partnership between AGGS and disadvantaged schools around East Manchester which attempts to help failing schools improve their performance. It began with Cedar Mount High School, now Cedar Mount Academy, which is located in Gorton, Manchester. Teachers from AGGS were sent on a temporary post to help teachers at Cedar Mount to improve their techniques. Heading the Trust became such a large job for Ross-Wawrzynski that she decided to hand over the management of Altrincham Grammar school for Girls to her Deputy, Mrs Mary Speakman, at the start of the school year beginning 2012. Speakman has since retired and the new head, Miss Stephanie Gill, took over her role at the start of the school year beginning 2014.

In December 2017, the school announced it was introducing a gender-neutral policy in communications for the sake of transgender and gender-questioning students, and would transition away from describing pupils as "girls".

The school site has been used by many production companies; the BBC used the Main Hall for the CBBC show All at Sea and it was later used by Netflix.

Results 
AGGS is one of the highest achieving schools in England and has gained status as a language college. In 2000 Ofsted found it to be "an extremely effective school that sets very high standards and achieves these through high quality teaching and excellent management and leadership". Most recently it has had excellent results in national GCSE exams with all students achieving an A*-C grade (a 100% pass rate) and with 80% of these students achieving at least a B. In 2007 it was listed fourth by The Independent among grammar schools with excellent A-level results. In 2008, At A2-Level, over 80% of students achieved all Bs or As, a high result nationally.

Feminist society controversy 
In the 2010s students started a feminist society and engaged with a national campaign called Who Needs Feminism, which involved posting pictures online of themselves holding placards with statements about their feminist convictions. After students received threats and abuse online in response to the pictures, school management, which had initially been supportive, asked that they be taken down. One of the students then published an op-ed in The Guardian accusing the school of failing to protect its students. The school's statement in response said that they only "recommend[ed]" that the pictures be removed. The students' campaign has since gone national after coverage on BBC Radio 4's Woman's Hour.

References

External links 
Altrincham Grammar School for Girls website

Educational institutions established in 1910
Grammar schools in Trafford
1910 establishments in England
Altrincham
Academies in Trafford
Girls' schools in England